Septimus is a rural locality in the Mackay Region, Queensland, Australia.

Geography 
The south of the locality is a large mountainous pastoral lease covered in natural bushland; its principal land use is grazing on native vegeation. The central area of the locality is part of the Mia Mia State Forest and is used for production forestry.

The northern part of the locality is low-lying land along the Pioneer River and its tributary Cattle Creek and is used for irrigated farming, predominantly growing sugarcane. A network of cane tramways carries the harvested sugarcane to the local sugar mills, the closest being Marian Mill in Marian to the north-east.

Septimus has the following mountains:

 Mount Jimmy Jacky 
 Mount Mia Mia

History 
The locality is believed to have taken its name from a praenomen.

Septimus Provisional School opened on 20 January 1904. On 1 January 1909 it became Septimus State School. The school was mothballed on 31 December 1999 and permanently closed on 24 August 2005. It was at 888-892 Gargett Mia Mia Road and was converted into holiday accommodation.

Education 
There are no schools in Septimus. The nearest government primary schools are Gargett State School in neighbouring Gargett to the north and Pinnacle State School in neighbouring Pinnacle to the north-west. The nearest government secondary school is Mirani State High School in neighbouring Mirani to the north-east.

References 

Mackay Region
Localities in Queensland